Denis Cannan (14 May 1919 – 25 September 2011) was a British dramatist, playwright and script writer. Born Denis Pullein-Thompson, the son of Captain Harold J. Pullein-Thompson and novelist Joanna Cannan, he changed his name by deed poll in 1964. His younger sisters were Josephine Pullein-Thompson, Diana Pullein-Thompson and Christine Pullein-Thompson.

Life
Pullein-Thompson was born in Oxford, he was educated at Eton College. After attending Eton he worked as an actor, before joining the Queen's Royal Regiment of West Surrey when the Second World War broke out, rising to the rank of captain and being mentioned in dispatches.

He was married to Joan Ross in 1946; the couple had two sons and a daughter. The marriage was dissolved, and he later remarried, to Rose Evansky in 1965.

Denis Cannan became a successful playwright and screenwriter known for his comedies. Apart from the plays listed below, he has written several screenplays for television and radio, also adaptions for television series. With Christopher Fry he adapted The Beggar's Opera for the 1953 film starring Laurence Olivier.
He also wrote the screenplay for the 1963 fim, Tamahine, which should be compared in theme to The French Mistress, from 1960, (itself adapted from the 1955 play).

Selected plays
 Captain Carvallo (1950)
 Misery Me! (1955)
 The Power and the Glory (adaptation) (1956)
 US (1966)
 Colombe
 Dear Daddy
 Ibsen's Ghosts (adaptation)
 Max
 One At Night
 The Ik (adaptation)
 You and Your Wife
 Who's Your Father?

Sources

External links
 

1919 births
2011 deaths
British Army personnel of World War II
People educated at Eton College
People from Oxford
Place of death missing
British male dramatists and playwrights
20th-century British dramatists and playwrights
20th-century British male writers
Queen's Royal Regiment officers